In computing, pushd and popd are commands used to work with the command line directory stack. They are available on command-line interpreters such as 4DOS, Bash, C shell, tcsh, Hamilton C shell, KornShell, cmd.exe, and PowerShell for operating systems such as Windows and Unix-like systems.

Overview
The pushd command saves the current working directory in memory so it can be returned to at any time, pushd moves to the parent directory. The popd command returns to the path at the top of the directory stack. This directory stack is accessed by the command dirs in Unix or Get-Location -stack in Windows PowerShell.

The first Unix shell to implement a directory stack was Bill Joy's C shell. The syntax for pushing and popping directories is essentially the same as that used now.

Both commands are available in FreeCOM, the command-line interface of FreeDOS.

In Windows PowerShell, pushd is a predefined command alias for the Push-Location cmdlet and popd is a predefined command alias for the Pop-Location cmdlet. Both serve basically the same purpose as the pushd and popd commands.

Syntax

Pushd
 pushd [path | ..]

Arguments:
path This optional command-line argument specifies the directory to make the current directory. If path is omitted, the path at the top of the directory stack is used, which has the effect of toggling between two directories.

Popd
 popd

Examples

Unix-like
[user@server /usr/ports] $ pushd /etc
/etc /usr/ports
[user@server /etc] $ popd
/usr/ports
[user@server /usr/ports] $

Microsoft Windows and ReactOS
C:\Users\root>pushd C:\Users
C:\Users>popd
C:\Users\root>

CMD batch file
@echo off
rem This batch file deletes all .txt files in a specified directory
pushd %1
del *.txt
popd
echo All text files deleted in the %1 directory

See also
List of DOS commands
List of Unix commands

References

Further reading

External links

 pushd | Microsoft Docs
 popd | Microsoft Docs

Internal DOS commands
Microcomputer software
ReactOS commands
Windows administration
Computing commands